Oct-1-en-3-one (CH2=CHC(=O)(CH2)4CH3), also known as 1-octen-3-one, is the odorant that is responsible for the typical "metallic" smell of metals and blood coming into contact with skin. Oct-1-en-3-one has a strong metallic mushroom-like odor with an odor detection threshold of 0.03–1.12 µg/m3 and it is the main compound responsible for the "smell of metal", followed by decanal (smell: orange skin, flowery) and nonanal (smell: tallowy, fruity). Oct-1-en-3-one is the degradative reduction product of the chemical reaction of skin lipid peroxides and Fe2+. Skin lipid peroxides are formed from skin lipid by oxidation, either enzymatically by lipoxygenases or by air oxygen. Oct-1-en-3-one is a ketone analog of the alkene 1-octene.

Natural occurrences 
It is also produced by Uncinula necator, a fungus that causes powdery mildew of grape.

See also 
 Odorant
 1-Octen-3-ol, the alcohol analog that is used by mosquitoes as an odor cue

References 

Flavors
Enones